Wudang Road Subdistrict is a subdistrict in Maojian District, Shiyan, Hubei, China.

Geography 
A medium-sized reservoir called the Majiahe Reservoir is located in Wudang Road Subdistrict.

Administrative divisions 
Wudang Road Subdistrict administers eight residential communities and three administrative villages.

Residential communities 
The subdistrict administers the following eight residential communities:

 Gujiagang Community
 Gongjiawan Community
 Lubei Community
 Majiahe Community
 Tiesanchu Community
 Hanjiagou Community
 Sanqiao Community
 Wenjiagou Community

Villages 
The subdistrict administers the following three villages:

 Gujia Village
 Yankou Village
 Majiahe Village

Demographics 
As of 2019, there are 54,075 people belonging to 21,024 households registered under the subdistrict's hukou. This is up from the 52,570 people belonging to 17,457 households in 2018.

Transportation 
Major roads that run through Wudang Road Subdistrict include Wudang Avenue, Chongqing Road, Maxiao Road, and Xiangyang Road.

References 

Township-level divisions of Hubei
Shiyan